Unity Lake State Recreation Site is a state park in the U.S. state of Oregon, administered by the Oregon Parks and Recreation Department.

Unity Dam was constructed in 1938 by the United States Bureau of Reclamation as an irrigation storage project. No hydroelectric power is generated here. The project is owned by the Bureau, and operated and maintained by the local Burnt River Irrigation District.

Facilities at the adjacent state park include cabins, camp sites, day-use parking and boat ramps.

See also
 List of Oregon state parks

References

External links
 

State parks of Oregon
Parks in Baker County, Oregon
Dams in Oregon
Reservoirs in Oregon
United States Bureau of Reclamation dams
Dams completed in 1938
1938 establishments in Oregon
Lakes of Baker County, Oregon
Buildings and structures in Baker County, Oregon